Rebecca "Becky" Flaherty (born 6 March 1998) is a professional footballer who plays as a goalkeeper for FA Women's National League North club Brighouse Town AFC Women and the Northern Ireland national team.

Club career
On 7 February 2018, Flaherty made her full debut for Liverpool, playing the 90 minutes in a 3–0 loss to Arsenal in the 2017–18 season.

On 1 August 2019, Flaherty completed a move to FA Women's Championship club Sheffield United.

On 29 July 2021, Huddersfield Town Women announced that Flaherty had joined the club for the 2021–22 season following a trial period against Celtic F.C. Women & Fleetwood Town Wrens.

International career
Flaherty was capped at youth level by Scotland but switched allegiances to Northern Ireland at senior level. In January 2019, Flaherty received her first call up to Northern Ireland's training camp. Flaherty made her senior international debut on 3 March 2019, starting in a 4–0 win over Kazakhstan in the Alanya Gold City Women's Cup.

References

External links

1998 births
Living people
Scottish women's footballers
Women's Super League players
Liverpool F.C. Women players
FA Women's National League players
Women's association football goalkeepers
Sheffield United W.F.C. players
Huddersfield Town W.F.C. players
Northern Ireland women's international footballers
UEFA Women's Euro 2022 players